SRS Cinemas is a cinema chain in India based in Faridabad, and owned by the SRS Group . One of the largest multiplex chain in North India with 20 Plexes, 56 Screens and presence in 15 Cities across North India with a total of 14,282 seats.

It began its commercial operations on 12 November 2004 with the first launch of SRS in Faridabad, and over the next few years, it opened multiplexes in cities like of Faridabad, Gurgaon, Ghaziabad, Bijnor, Patiala, Ludhiana, Lucknow, Agra, Bareilly, Bhiwadi, Hajipur, Kashipur, Muktsar, Ranchi, Saharanpur and the hills station of Shimla. By December 2013, with the opening of SRS Cinemas at Bhiwadi, Rajasthan, it had 16 multiplexes, which grew to 19 multiplexes in April 2014, with the opening of SRS Cinemas at Sarv Multiplex at Agra, Uttar Pradesh. On 27 March 2015, SRS Cinemas opened at Cinekrishna Multiplex cum mall, Hajipur with 2 Audi's and seating capacity of 500 and On 10 April 2015, SRS Cinemas opened at GnG Mall, Saharanpur with 4 AUDI's and seating capacity of 1132.

Current locations

References

External links
SRS Cinemas official website

Cinema chains in India
Entertainment companies established in 2004
Companies based in Haryana
Faridabad
2004 establishments in Haryana
Indian companies established in 2004